Jean Claude Ades is a German-born electronic music producer. He has resided and worked in Italy, France, and Spain, specialising in house and electro music.

Biography
Ades first started DJ-ing at the age of 16. In 1995 he has released his first single under the artist name J.C.A. In 2002 he changed it to Krystal K. In 2006 he found his own label, B!CRAZY, which is today also an entertainment venue in Ibiza owned by Ades. He gained further prominence by releasing digital tracks through Beatport during the 2010s.

Ades gained worldwide popularity after releasing "Shingaling" in April 2008 alongside another French producer Thomas Vincent. The track is a mixture of electrotech and tribal house and features samples from the 1968 salsa hit "Shingaling Shingaling" by Puerto-Rican band Kako & His Orchestra.

In 2019 Ades moved to a private villa in Mykonos (Greece) where he resides up to this day and releases mixtape podcasts since the COVID-19 pandemic.

Notable contributions
Particularly noted for his work with pop and dance vocalist Dannii Minogue, Jean Claude Ades co-wrote and produced Minogue's biggest hit "I Begin to Wonder", under the pseudonym J.C.A., along with three further tracks, "Come and Get It", "Feel Like I Do" and "Free Falling". He also helped produce the song "Lovers Till the End" with Christian Burns, for the album Simple Modern Answers.

His better known remixes include that of The Nightcrawlers' "Push The Feeling On", Coburn's "We Interrupt this Programme", Tomcraft's "Da Disco", The Roc Project's "Never (Past Tense)", and iiO's "At the End". Ades' hit singles include "Some Day", "Fly Away", "Nite Time", and Angel City's "Love Me Right (Oh Sheila)"

Under the alias Krystal K, while residing in Munich, Germany, he produced a major hit on the Billboard Dance Top 40 chart in 2004, with "Let's Get It Right",

Discography
(selective)

as Krystal K
2002: Krystal K. - "Let's Get It Right" 
2003: Dannii Minogue - "I Begin to Wonder"
as J.C.A / JCA
1995: J.C.A. feat. Alexxa - "The Colour of My Style"
1998: J.C.A. - "I Want You"
2002: J.C.A. – "I Begin to Wonder"
2003: J.C.A. - "I'll See Her Again"
2003: J.C.A. feat. Dannii Minogue - "Come And Get It"
2003: J.C.A. Remix - "Sans Contrefaçon" (Mylène FARMER song)
2005: JCA - "Fly Away"
2005: JCA - "Some Day"
2005: J.C.A. & Melih Ask - "Journey to Instanbul"
2008: JCA Presents Solaphonics - Total Love
2012: JCA feat. Tyra - "Only Tonight"
as Jean Claude Ades

 2008: Jean Claude Ades - Finally (album)
 2010: Jean Claude Ades & Mantu – "Blue Note"
 2012: Jean Claude Ades - We All Are Dancing
 2012: Jean Claude Ades and Rony Seikaly - East West EP
 2012: Jean Claude Ades - You Make Me Feel
 2013: Jean Claude Ades & Sharam Jey – Happy Mondays EP
 2013: Jean Claude Ades -  Be Crazy Friends #1
 2014: Jean Claude Ades -  Coming Home EP
 2014: Jean Claude Ades -  East West EP, Vol. 2
 2015: Jean Claude Ades -  Red Bus EP
 2016: Jean Claude Ades - Out of My Head
 2016: Jean Claude Ades -  Between Spaces EP
 2017: Jean Claude Ades - Appassionata / Ordinary Day
 2018: Jean Claude Ades FT. Sterea - Ordinary Day (Tone Depth Remix)
 2019: Jean Claude Ades - Illusion
 2019: Jean Claude Ades - Atme
 2020: Jean Claude Ades -  Best of 2010 - 2020

Charting singles

References

External links
Official website

Italian record producers
German DJs
German trance musicians
Living people
Electronic dance music DJs
Year of birth missing (living people)